Seán O'Grady (1 December 1889 – 7 April 1966) was an Irish Fianna Fáil politician. He was unsuccessful when he first stood as a candidate for Dáil Éireann at the June 1927 general election, in the Clare constituency, but was elected as a Teachta Dála (TD) there at the 1932 general election. He was re-elected there at every election until he lost his Dáil seat at the 1951 general election. In 1951, he was nominated by the Taoiseach to the 7th Seanad, and in 1957, he was nominated to the 9th Seanad.

O'Grady had been only a few months in the Dáil when he was appointed a Parliamentary Secretary. Over the next sixteen years until 1948 he served in a range of ministries as Parliamentary Secretary, including Lands and Fisheries; Defence; Industry and Commerce; and Finance. He was defeated in his final campaign at the 1957 general election.

References

 

1889 births
1966 deaths
Fianna Fáil TDs
Members of the 7th Dáil
Members of the 8th Dáil
Members of the 9th Dáil
Members of the 10th Dáil
Members of the 11th Dáil
Members of the 12th Dáil
Members of the 13th Dáil
Members of the 7th Seanad
Members of the 9th Seanad
Parliamentary Secretaries of the 12th Dáil
Parliamentary Secretaries of the 11th Dáil
Parliamentary Secretaries of the 10th Dáil
Parliamentary Secretaries of the 9th Dáil
Parliamentary Secretaries of the 8th Dáil
Parliamentary Secretaries of the 7th Dáil
Nominated members of Seanad Éireann
Fianna Fáil senators